Bernard Samuel Tchoutang (born 2 September 1976) is a Cameroonian former professional football player who played as a striker. He was part of the victorious Cameroonian 2000 African Nations Cup team. He also took part at the 2001 FIFA Confederations Cup.

Tchoutang played for Vanspor in the Turkish Super Lig and Roda JC in the Dutch Eredivisie.

Honours
Roda JC
KNVB Cup: 1999–2000

Cameroon
African Nations Cup: 2000

References

External links
 

Living people
1976 births
Footballers from Yaoundé
Association football forwards
Cameroonian footballers
Cameroon under-20 international footballers
Cameroon international footballers
2001 FIFA Confederations Cup players
1996 African Cup of Nations players
1998 African Cup of Nations players
2000 African Cup of Nations players
Ukrainian Premier League players
Süper Lig players
Eredivisie players
Vanspor footballers
Roda JC Kerkrade players
Hapoel Petah Tikva F.C. players
Viborg FF players
Sri Pahang FC players
FC Metalurh Donetsk players
KF Elbasani players
Cameroonian expatriate footballers
Expatriate footballers in Israel
Expatriate footballers in the Netherlands
Cameroonian expatriate sportspeople in Ukraine
Expatriate footballers in Ukraine
Expatriate men's footballers in Denmark
Cameroonian expatriate sportspeople in Albania
Expatriate footballers in Albania
Cameroonian expatriate sportspeople in Malaysia
Expatriate footballers in Malaysia